The Stearman Model 6 Cloudboy was a 1930s American training biplane designed and built by the Stearman Aircraft Company of Wichita, Kansas.

History
The Cloudboy was designed as a commercial or military trainer. Due to economic pressure during the Great Depression, only a few aircraft were built.
Three civil models were built, followed by four similar aircraft for evaluation by the United States Army Air Corps. Designated YPT-9 by the Army, it failed to gain any orders. All models went through a number of engine changes (resulting in new designations for both the military and civil aircraft).

Variants

Model 6A Cloudboy
Initial civil production with a  Wright J-6 Whirlwind 5 engine, three built.
Model 6C Cloudboy
Re-engined with a  Wright J-6-9 Whirlwind (R-975-1), also designated YBT-3.
Model 6D Cloudboy
Re-engined with a  Pratt & Whitney Wasp Junior, also designated YBT-5
Model 6F Cloudboy
Re-engined with a  Continental A70 engine, also designated YBT-9A.
Model 6H Cloudboy
Re-engined with a  Kinner YR-720A engine, also designated YBT-9C.
Model 6L Cloudboy
Re-engined with a  Lycoming R-680-3 engine, also designated YBT-9B

Model 6P Cloudboy
One 6F re-engined with 1  Wright J-5 engine
YPT-9
Military production variant of the Model 6A with a  Wright J-6 Whirlwind 5 engine, four built (one converted to YPT-9A, one to YPT-9B, one to YBT-3 and one YBT-5).
YPT-9A
One YPT-9 re-engined with a  Continental A70 (YR-545-1) engine, later converted to YPT-9B.
YPT-9B
One YPT-9 and one YPT-9A re-engined with a  Lycoming R-680-3 engine.
YPT-9C
YBT-3 re-engined with a  Kinner YR-720A engine.
YBT-3
One YPT-9 re-engined with a  Wright J-6-9 Whirlwind, later converted to a YPT-9C.
YBT-5
One YPT-9 re-engined with a  Pratt & Whitney R-985-1 Wasp Junior engine.
XPT-943
A primary trainer derived from the 6A for evaluation at Wright Field. Formed the origins of the Stearman NS and PT-13 for the US Navy and USAAC respectively.
X-70
Alternative company designation for the XPT-943.

Operators

United States Army Air Corps

Surviving aircraft
 6002 – 6L airworthy at the Candler Field Museum in Williamson, Georgia.
 6003 – 6L airworthy at the Western Antique Aeroplane & Automobile Museum in Hood River, Oregon. It was previously owned by the Golden Wings Flying Museum.
 6004 – YPT-9B on display at the Yanks Air Museum in Chino, California. It was previously owned by the Boeing School of Aeronautics and was acquired by the museum in 1987.
 6010 – 6C airworthy with Robert Lock of Lakeland, Florida.

Specifications (YPT-9B)

See also

Notes

References

External links

 Aerofiles - Stearman
 Aerofiles - Cloudboy 6A photo
 San Diego Air & Space Museum Archives - Cloudboy 6C photo

Cloudboy
1930s United States military trainer aircraft
Biplanes
Single-engined tractor aircraft
Aircraft first flown in 1931